
Boulton is an English surname. Notable people with the surname include:

A 
 Adam Boulton (born 1959), British journalist, Editor-at-large of Sky News
  (1908–1995), Venezuelan photographer, founder of Boulton Foundation
  (1909–1994), Venezuelan entrepreneur of Venezuelan Boulton Group
  (born 1943), Venezuelan writer and philosopher

B 
  (born 1960), Venezuelan musicologist

C 
 Charles Arkoll Boulton (1841–1899), British lieutenant colonel in the Red River Rebellion
 Clint Boulton (1948–2021), English footballer

D 
 Doris Boulton-Maude born Doris Boulton (1892–1961), Englısh artist

E 
  (1940–2003), Venezuelan entrepreneur of Venezuelan Boulton Group 
 Eric Boulton (born 1976), British ice hockey player
 Ernest Boulton (1848–1905), British actor accused in the Boulton and Park transvestism trial

H 
  (1829–1891), Venezuelan entrepreneur of Venezuelan Boulton Group
  (1920–2015), Venezuelan entrepreneur of Venezuelan Boulton Group
  (born 1936), Venezuelan entrepreneur of Venezuelan Boulton Group

I 
 Isaac Watt Boulton (1823–1899), British engineer, owned a locomotive-hire business known as Boulton's Siding

J 
  (1870–1940), Venezuelan entrepreneur of Venezuelan Boulton Group
  (1805–1875), British entrepreneur founder of Venezuelan Boulton Group

L  
 Laura Boulton (1899–1980), American ethnomusicologist

M 
  (born 1956), Venezuelan photographer
  (born 1978), Venezuelan photographer
  (1907–2003), Venezuelan philanthropist
 Marjorie Boulton (1924–2017), British writer
 Matthew Boulton (1728–1809), British manufacturer and business partner of James Watt
 Matthew Piers Watt Boulton (1820–1894), British classicist, amateur scientist and inventor
 Matthew Robinson Boulton (1770–1842), British manufacturer and son of Matthew Boulton

R 
 Ralph Boulton (1923–1992), English footballer
 Richard Boulton Winckelmann (born 1964), Venezuelan entrepreneur of Venezuelan Boulton Group
  (born 1937), Venezuelan entrepreneur of Venezuelan Boulton Group 
  (born 1960), Venezuelan economist

V 
  (born 1979), Venezuelan designer

W 
 William Savage Boulton (1867–1954), English geologist

English-language surnames